Okhotigone is a genus of spiders in the family Linyphiidae. The genus contains one species, Okhotigone sounkyoensis, found in Russia, China and Japan.

It was originally described in 1986 as Walckenaeria sounkyoensis but moved to the new genus Okhotigone in 1993.

References

Linyphiidae
Monotypic Araneomorphae genera
Spiders of Russia
Spiders of Asia